Latino Peak is peak  high situated  south-southwest of Mount Hazlett in the Victory Mountains of Victoria Land, Antarctica. It is the highest peak in the vicinity of the bifurcation where Tucker Glacier and Pearl Harbor Glacier converge. Its western slope is drained by Summers Glacier.

The peak was mapped by the United States Geological Survey from surveys and U.S. Navy aerial photos, 1960–64, and was named by the Advisory Committee on Antarctic Names for Terry L. Latino, a U.S. Navy SeaBee who camped at McMurdo Station on Ross Island as a member the U.S. Navy  Antarctic Support summer expeditions of  1965, 1966. He also wintered there as a member of the Operation Deep Freeze Winter-Over party of 1967 and also served in the Vietnam War in 1968–69.

References

Mountains of Victoria Land
Borchgrevink Coast